The King's Fund is an independent think tank, which is involved with work relating to the health system in England. It organises conferences and other events.

Since 1997, they have jointly funded a yearly award system with GlaxoSmithKline. They reward small to medium-sized health charities who are improving people's health.

The Chief Executive is Richard Murray.  Before 1948 the body contributed significantly to London's voluntary hospitals.

History
Founded as the Prince of Wales's Hospital Fund for London in 1897, the fund changed its name in 1902 to King Edward's Hospital Fund after the accession to the throne of King Edward VII. In 1907, Parliament incorporated the fund as the King's Fund.

George Stephen, 1st Baron Mount Stephen worked closely with the future George V in building the charity's endowment fund. Lord Mount Stephen was the charity's most important benefactor, having made gifts to the amount of £1,315,000.

The fund was originally set up to contribute to London's voluntary hospitals and did so, which it later started to inspect and expand. After the NHS was created in 1948, the fund became a think tank. In 1992 the influential King‘s Fund‘s Commission on London's Health Care identified high costs and lower throughput of central London hospitals and recommended reduction in acute services and parallel improvements in primary care.

See also
List of UK think tanks
Nuffield Trust
Health Foundation
Coproduction of public services by service users and communities

References

External links

 The King's Fund

Organizations established in 1897
National Health Service (England)
Health charities in the United Kingdom
Health in London
Public policy think tanks based in the United Kingdom
1897 establishments in England